The 1972 Intercontinental Cup was an association football tie held over two legs in September 1972 between the winners of the 1971–72 European Cup, Ajax, and the winners of the 1972 Copa Libertadores, Independiente.

The first leg was held on 6 September 1972 at Independiente Stadium (La Doble Visera), home of Independiente, and ended in a 1–1 draw, with goals from Johan Cruyff and Francisco Sá. The return leg was held on 28 September 1972 at the Olympic Stadium, which was won by Ajax 3–0. Therefore the Dutch side won their first Intercontinental Cup trophy.

Qualified teams

Venues

Overview 
The match was notable for being the first and only time Johan Cruyff played in Argentina, as he would not join the trip with the Netherlands national team to the 1978 FIFA World Cup where the Dutch team reached the final. Ajax arrived in Argentina bringing their own cook and food. Some Dutch supporters had previously arrived not only to watch the match but on a tourist trip to known Buenos Aires sites. 

The early goal by Cruyff (who might have fouled Independiente defender Miguel Angel López and or might have been fouled by Miguel Angel López before scoring) dictated the direction of the match. Since that, Independiente's style of play turned towards toughness to stop Ajax players. As a result, Cruyff had to leave the field after a hard tackle by defender Dante Mírcoli. At the end of the first half, the Ajax players were so angry at Independiente players' violence that they refused to take to the field for the second half. Their coach Ștefan Kovács had to implore them to play on.

After the match, the Ajax players complained about the violence shown by their rivals. Forward Sjaak Swart defined rival defender Ricardo Pavoni as "a gangster", also stating "he believes he is Carlos Monzón" to describe the Uruguayan's stiffness. In the same line, Ajax manager Kovacs added his testimony saying: "This was not football but war.... In Amsterdam, Independiente will have serious troubles. One of them, our magnificent pitch so they are not used to play on those surfaces. This pitch (Independiente Stadium) is not suitable to play football"

Some football personalities attended the match in Avellaneda, being president of Real Madrid CF Santiago Bernabéu one of the most notable visitors. Once the match ended, Bernabéu said:

In the second leg held in Amsterdam, Ajax made a great performance, showing all their virtues to easily defeat Independiente 3–0, therefore winning their first Intercontinental trophy 3–1 on points (4–1 on aggregate).

Match details

First leg

|valign="top" width="50%"|

|}

Second leg

Match details
 

|valign="top" width="50%"|

|}

See also
1971–72 European Cup
1972 Copa Libertadores
AFC Ajax in international football competitions

References

 

Intercontinental Cup
Intercontinental Cup
Intercontinental Cup
Intercontinental Cup
1972
Intercontinental Cup 1972
Intercontinental Cup 1972
Intercontinental Cup 1972
Intercontinental Cup 1972
Intercontinental Cup, 1972
1970s in Amsterdam
September 1972 sports events in Europe
Football in Avellaneda